Bratacharini  is a 1955 Bengali film directed by Kamal Ganguly. It stars Uttam Kumar and Sabitri Chatterjee in lead roles.

Synopsis
The lead character is played by Sandhya Rani. Her son Uttam Kumar marries Sabitri Chatterjee which is opposed by her.

Cast
 Uttam Kumar
 Sabitri Chatterjee
 Bhanu Bandyopadhyay
 Chhabi Biswas
 Sandhya Rani
 Chhaya Devi

References

External links
 

1955 films
Bengali-language Indian films
1950s Bengali-language films
Films scored by Kamal Dasgupta
Indian drama films
1955 drama films